A Vatican passport is a passport issued by the Holy See or by Vatican City State. The state can issue normal passports for its citizens; the Holy See (see Legal status of the Holy See) issues personal, diplomatic and service passports.

Of the approximately 800 residents of Vatican City, over 450 have Vatican citizenship. These include the approximately 135 Swiss Guards. About the same number of citizens of the state live in various countries, chiefly in the diplomatic service of the Holy See.

The Vatican City State law on citizenship, residence and access, which was promulgated on 22 February 2011, classifies citizens in three categories:
 Cardinals resident in Vatican City or in Rome;
 Diplomats of the Holy See;
 Persons residing in Vatican City because of their office or service.

Only for the third category is an actual grant of citizenship required.

Diplomatic passports of the Holy See, not passports of the Vatican State, are held by those in the Holy See's diplomatic service.

Service passports of the Holy See can be issued to people in the service of the Holy See even if not citizens of Vatican City.

Vatican City passports are issued to citizens of the state who are not in the service of the Holy See.

Passports issued by Vatican City are in Italian, French and English, those issued by the Holy See are in Latin, French and English.

See also
 Sovereign Military Order of Malta passport
 Italian passport
 Visa requirements for Vatican citizens

References

Vatican
Government of Vatican City
Foreign relations of the Holy See